Laguna del Maule is a lake located in the Andes of Central Chile. The lake is natural in origin, but its water level was raised by a dam inaugurated in 1957. It is located at 2,165 metres above sea level. It has a capacity of 1,420 million m3.

See also
Laguna del Maule (volcano)

References

Lakes of Chile
Lakes of Maule Region